Gérard Meister (4 September 1889 – 7 November 1967) was a French freestyle swimmer. He competed in the 100 m event at the 1908 and 1912 Summer Olympics, but failed to reach the finals.

References

1889 births
1967 deaths
French male freestyle swimmers
Swimmers at the 1908 Summer Olympics
Swimmers at the 1912 Summer Olympics
Olympic swimmers of France
Swimmers from Paris